The 2017–18 Mestis season is the 18th season of Mestis, the second highest level of ice hockey in Finland after Liiga. Imatran Ketterä was promoted from Suomi-sarja at the end of last season, while JYP-Akatemia and Hokki faced bankruptcy and were relegated.

Clubs

Regular season
Top eight advance to the Mestis playoffs while the bottom two face the top two teams from Suomi-sarja for a relegation playoff. Since the highest series of Finnish hockey is a closed series no team will be promoted to Liiga.

Rules for classification: 1) Points; 2) Goal difference; 3) Goals scored; 4) Head-to-head points; 5) Penalty minutes.

Playoffs
Playoffs are being played in three stages. Each stage is a best-of-7 series. The teams are reseeded after the quarterfinals, so that the best team by regular season performance to make the semifinals faces the worst team in the semifinals.

Bracket

Quarterfinals

Semifinals

Bronze medal game

Finals 

KeuPa HT wins the series 4-2.

Relegation playoffs
The bottom two teams will face the top two teams from Suomi-sarja for a best-of-7 series were the winners will get a place in Mestis for the next season.

No team got relegated from or promoted to Mestis for the next season.

See also
 2017–18 Liiga season

References

Mestis seasons
Mestis
Mestis